Basti is both a given name and a surname. Notable people with the name include:

Abderraouf El Basti (born 1947), Tunisian politician
Basti Vaman Shenoy (1934–2022), Indian Kolkani activist
Yagi Basti (died  1344), a ruler of Shiraz, Iran

See also
Básti